Ali Apong (born 18 August 1958) is a Bruneian politician who serves as the Deputy Minister of Development and for the Prime Minister's Office from 2010 until 2015. He later became the Minister of Primary Resources and Tourism from 2015 until 2022.

Early life and education 
Ali Apong is born on 18 August 1958, in Kampong Kuala Abang, Tutong. He graduated from University of Reading with honours degree in Economics and later earned both his postgraduate diploma in Management and Master of Business Administration from the Imperial College of Science, Technology and Medicine.

Political career 
He first began his career as an Investment Officer in the Brunei Investment Agency (BIA) in 1983, followed by a later appointment to an Assistant Managing Director on 1 September 1997. From 1999 until early 2002, he was part of a Ministry of Finance and Economy team to establish the Brunei International Financial Centre, before returning to his previous position in the BIA. In 2004, Ali Apong was appointed as a Permanent Secretary in the Ministry of Finance and Economy on October 21, 2004, and later transferred to the Prime Minister's Office (PMO) with the same position on 24 September 2009.

Ali Apong later held the position of a Deputy Minister in the Ministry of Development on 20 May 2010. On 18 November 2010, he became the Deputy Minister in the PMO, until the reshuffling of the council on 22 October 2015, where it was then announced that he had been reappointed as the first Minister for the newly established Ministry of Primary Resources and Tourism. The cabinet reshuffled again on 7 June 2022, his position as the Minister was succeeded by Abdul Manaf Metussin.

Awards and honours 
 
 Order of Seri Paduka Mahkota Brunei Second Class (DPMB) – Dato Paduka

 Order of Setia Negara Brunei First Class (PSNB) – Dato Seri Setia

See also 
 Cabinet of Brunei

References 

Living people
1958 births
Government ministers of Brunei